U.M. & M. TV Corporation was an American media company best known as the original purchaser of the pre-October 1950 short films and cartoons produced by Paramount Pictures,  excluding Popeye and Superman. The initials stand for United Film Service (which once employed Walt Disney and other animators many years earlier), MTA TV (Motion Picture Advertising Service) of New Orleans, and Minot T.V.

Operations of the three above-mentioned companies were consolidated into a new company, U.M. & M., in October 1954. The companies were previously producing TV commercials. Matty Fox, head of Motion Pictures for Television, signed a ten-year agreement with U.M. & M. to handle sub-distribution of its TV series.

U.M. & M. handled the physical distribution of the television series Paris Precinct and Sherlock Holmes, and others. It did not market the shows, leaving the actual syndication to Guild Films.

Deals 
In 1955, Paramount Pictures announced it was selling its short films and cartoons, and even a few of its features, including the Max Fleischer animated features Gulliver's Travels and Mr. Bug Goes to Town.

Represented by A. W. Schwalberg, a former Paramount sales executive, U.M. & M. won the bid on December 28, 1955, buying 1,600 short subjects for $3.5 million. U.M. & M. got most of the pre-October 1950 material that Paramount put up for sale except for the Popeye cartoons (including the Betty Boop cartoon Popeye the Sailor), which were sold to Associated Artists Productions and are now owned by Turner Entertainment, and the Superman cartoons, due to their rights reverting from Paramount to National Periodical Publications (now DC Comics) after the studio's film rights to the character expired.

The material that U.M. & M. obtained from Paramount also included many live action short subjects, such as Cab Calloway and Duke Ellington shorts from the 1930s. Burns and Allen shorts were also included, as well as an early short, Singapore Sue, featuring a young Cary Grant.

Other short subjects included in the sale included the following:
 Inkwell Imps, The Max Fleischer Ko-Ko the Clown cartoons that were originally distributed by Paramount
 Screen Songs, except the last six entries which were sold to Harvey Comics and are now owned by Classic Media
 Talkartoons, Early Paramount sound cartoon series
 Betty Boop
 Color Classics
 Gabby
 Stone Age Cartoons
 Animated Antics
 The Fleischer two-reelers Raggedy Ann and Raggedy Andy and The Raven
 Almost all Noveltoons released prior to October 1950, including three early appearances from Casper and the first five Little Audrey shorts.
 Little Lulu cartoons produced by Famous Studios
 George Pal Puppetoons
 Speaking of Animals shorts produced by Jerry Fairbanks, now owned by Shields Pictures

The latest-released cartoon in the package was the Screen Songs cartoon, Boos in the Nite, released September 22, 1950. A total of 513 animated productions (shorts and features) from Fleischer, Famous, and George Pal were included in the package. The package was eyed by NBC for airing nationally, but this deal apparently fell through. ABC would air a repackaging of many Paramount cartoons released after September 1950 once these cartoons were sold to Harvey Films.

Retitling and marketing the Paramount shorts 
At the insistence of Paramount Pictures, who did not want their company name or mountain logo appearing on television at the time, U.M. & M. replaced the Paramount logo with its (usually) blue shield logo, and removed all references to Paramount Pictures, except for the phrase "Adolph Zukor presents". It is believed that U.M. & M. and NTA did not figure that TV viewers would link Zukor's name with Paramount Pictures, which Zukor founded.

U.M. & M. color prints of Paramount cartoons usually have the opening credits listed in yellow print on a red background. Eventually, U.M. & M. started preserving the original credits, but continued to remove references to Paramount, Technicolor, Cinecolor, and Polacolor since the television prints were done in either Eastmancolor or Deluxe. The Eastmancolor prints generally have faded to red.

For the black-and-white cartoons and shorts, U.M. & M. removed the Paramount logos from the original negatives and substituted its opening logo and an end card reading "A U.M. & M. TV Corp. Presentation" for the Paramount mountain. The Paramount copyright was replaced with the U.M. & M. copyright byline, but prints of Betty Boop cartoons have turned up with original Paramount copyright bylines on the Olive Films releases of Betty Boop.

U.M. & M. began marketing the Paramount shorts and cartoons, at the expense of the live-action made-for-television product it was already syndicating.  The marketing included a Miss Cartoon girl at their sales table at the NARTB convention in Chicago.  Before all of the shorts could be retitled, National Telefilm Associates bought out the U.M. & M. package in May 1956 for $4 million. The U.M. & M. copyright notices continued to be present on the NTA prints. The shorts were syndicated under NTA's Panorama of Entertaining Programs, as well as sold for home movie distribution.

For this reason, the majority of the color cartoons purchased by U.M. & M. appear with NTA titles, though a select few circulate with U.M. & M. openings and closings. Most Little Lulu cartoons circulate with U.M. & M. openings  however. A few feature a revised U.M. & M. logo with the original credits intact, though all references to Paramount and Technicolor are blacked out. These prints contain the only titles where the word "Corporation" in the U.M. & M. copyright is actually spelled out, and not abbreviated "Corp."

NTA acquired the Republic Pictures name in 1984, and through several acquisitions was eventually merged into Paramount Pictures, which in turn was owned by Viacom (as it has been since 1994). In early 2006, Viacom split itself into two corporations, one called Viacom (still owning Paramount Pictures), and the other called CBS Corporation. As a result, what would become Melange Pictures, LLC, a division of Viacom, now owns the theatrical distribution on behalf of Paramount Animation — all the more ironic since Paramount Pictures originally released the classic shorts in the first place — while Trifecta Entertainment & Media (inherited from CBS Television Distribution) owns the television distribution on behalf of Paramount Television Studios to the U.M. & M./NTA/Republic/Melange library, and Olive Films (under license from Paramount Home Entertainment) owns the home video distribution. Viacom and CBS re-merged on December 4, 2019, as ViacomCBS (which eventually renamed into Paramount Global).

However, restoration of the original Paramount openings to the black and white cartoons and shorts would be difficult, since U.M. & M. actually altered the original black-and-white negatives, although with today's CGI technology it is possible to authentically recreate such titles. The UCLA Film and Television Archive has restored many of the classic Paramount cartoons, complete with their original titles.

See also 
 FTC v. Motion Picture Advertising Service Co.

References 

Mass media companies established in 1954
Film distributors of the United States
Mass media companies disestablished in 1957